PAF may refer to:

Computing 
 Personal Ancestral File, a genealogy data program
 PME Aggregation Function, a networking technology
 Postcode Address File, a collection of UK postal addresses and postcodes, available from Royal Mail
 .PAF, filename extension of PortableApps files

Medicine
 Paroxysmal atrial fibrillation
 Platelet-activating factor
 Population attributable fraction (epidemiology)
 Pure autonomic failure

Military
 Palestinian Arab Front
 Protestant Action Force

Air forces
 Pakistan Air Force
 PAF Academy Risalpur, see Pakistan Air Force Academy
 PAF College Lower Topa
 PAF College Sargodha
 Patrouille de France, an aerobatic team of the French Air Force
 Philippine Air Force
 Polish Air Force

Science 
 Phased array Feed
 Population attributable fraction
 Platelet-activating factor

Other uses
 PAF (pickup), a first humbucker guitar pickup
 Paf (company), a Finnish gambling company
 Palestine Athletic Federation
 Performing Arts Festival of Indian Institute of Technology Bombay
 Professional Arena Football, a professional sport league launched in 2018
 Pakuba Airport's IATA airport code
 Phineas and Ferb, an animated series

See also
 PAF Public School (disambiguation), Pakistan Air Force-operated boarding schools